The fifth season of Food Paradise, an American food reality television series narrated by Jess Blaze Snider (formally Mason Pettit) on the Travel Channel, premiered on July 22, 2014. First-run episodes of the series aired in the United States on the Travel Channel on Mondays at 10:00 p.m. EDT. The season contained 7 episodes and concluded airing on August 26, 2014.

Food Paradise features the best places to find various cuisines at food locations across America. Each episode focuses on a certain type of restaurant, such as "Diners", "Bars", "Drive-Thrus" or "Breakfast" places that people go to find a certain food specialty.

Episodes

Food Paradise: Sturgis' Most Tasty
During Sturgis Motorcycle Rally, a week dedicated to motorcycles, restaurants double and triple the size of their staff and food vendors come from all over the country to set up shop and serve the masses.

Note: The list below represents the best and tastiest food from Sturgis' rally week.

BBQ Paradise 3

Hamburger Paradise 3

Hot & Spicy Paradise 2

Sandwich Paradise 3

Deep Fried Paradise 4

Burrito Paradise

References

External links
Food Paradise @Travelchannel.com

2014 American television seasons